HMS Lauderdale was a  destroyer of the Royal Navy. Ships of this class were designed as cheap, easily built vessels for convoy escort and antisubmarine duties. She was named like her sisters after a fox hunt, in her case one in Berwickshire. War bonds were issued to finance the building of warships. During Warship Week held in 1942 the civil community of Berwickshire adopted the ship. She has been the only Royal Navy warship to carry this name.

Service history
On commissioning she was allocated for duty in the Western Approaches and crossed the Atlantic to Canada for trials - the only Hunt Class vessel to make the crossing. At the end of March 1942 she returned to Londonderry and undertook North Sea convoy escort duty for the rest of the year.

In 1943 she was allocated for service in the Mediterranean, including support of the allied landings on Sicily in July of that year. In 1944 she continued operations in the Mediterranean and was allocated to support the landings in the South of France. She ended the year in the Adriatic Sea supporting operations there.

In 1945 Lauderdale was allocated for service in the Far East and underwent a refit at Simonstown, South Africa.

Greek service

In 1946 she was transferred to the Royal Hellenic Navy and renamed Aigaion. She was removed from the effective list and returned to British ownership on 12 December 1959 and scrapped in Greece in 1960.

References

Publications
 
 English, John (1987). The Hunts: a history of the design, development and careers of the 86 destroyers of this class built for the Royal and Allied Navies during World War II. England: World Ship Society. .

 

1941 ships
Ships built in Southampton
Hunt-class destroyers of the Royal Navy
Hunt-class destroyers of the Hellenic Navy
World War II destroyers of the United Kingdom
Ships built by John I. Thornycroft & Company